Fernando Moreira Gonçalves (born 4 December 1967, in Cascais) is a former Portuguese footballer. He played as forward. He began playing football professionally in 1986 and retired in 2000.

External links 
 
 

1967 births
Living people
Portuguese footballers
Association football forwards
Primeira Liga players
C.F. Os Belenenses players
C.F. Estrela da Amadora players
S.C. Campomaiorense players
Portugal international footballers
Sportspeople from Cascais